The Thai Ambassador in Beijing is the official representative of the Government in Bangkok to the Government of China.

President of the Republic of China

List of representatives to the Republic of China (1912–1949)

List of representatives to the Republic of China (Taiwan)

List of representatives to the People's Republic of China

See also 
 China–Thailand relations

References 

 
China
Thailand